Josefine Huber (born 19 February 1996) is an Austrian handballer for Thüringer HC and the Austrian national team.

She represented Austria at the 2021 World Women's Handball Championship, placing 16th.

References

1996 births
Living people
Austrian female handball players
Handball players from Vienna